The Frick Pittsburgh is a cluster of museums and historical buildings located in Pittsburgh, Pennsylvania, United States and formed around the Frick family's nineteenth-century residence known as "Clayton". It focuses on the interpretation of the life and times of Henry Clay Frick (1849–1919), industrialist and art collector.

The site welcomes over 100,000 visitors a year. Admission is free.

Helen Clay Frick (1888—1984) was the driving force to preserve the Frick estate and allow it to open to the public after her death.

History

Today's museum began as an eleven-room, Italianate-style house purchased by the Fricks shortly after their marriage in 1881.  The house was built in the 1860s, original architect unknown.  After modifications by Pittsburgh architect Andrew Peebles, it was renamed "Clayton".  Further remodeling of the house was done in 1892 by Pittsburgh architect Frederick J. Osterling.  The Playhouse was constructed in 1897 to designs by architects Alden & Harlow. The house served as the Fricks' primary residence from 1883 to 1905.  The Fricks moved to New York City in 1905, where they eventually established the Frick Collection, but in 1981 daughter Helen Clay Frick returned to Clayton, where she had previously spent part of each year, and remained there permanently until her death in 1984. Clayton opened to the public in 1990, and in 1997 the 1950s carriage house was enlarged to create the Car and Carriage Museum.

In May 2013 the center announced a $15 million renovation to break ground on June 6, 2013.

Collections
The Frick Art Museum's collection includes a large group of works on paper by Jean-François Millet, Renaissance and Baroque bronzes, and nineteenth-century European paintings. There are also Late Medieval and Renaissance paintings of a devotional nature by: Bernardo Daddi, Lippo Memmi, Giovanni di Paolo, Francesco di Vannuccio ("Saint Catherine"), Rainaldo di Rainuccio da Spoleto, Sassetta, Matteo Di Giovanni, Francesco Melzi, and Jean Bellegambe. In the Frick Art Museum, there are Renaissance and Baroque paintings with secular themes by: Apollonio Di Giovanni ("Scenes from Homer's Odyssey"), Jean-Louis de Marne ("Seine at Saint Cloud"), Carle Van Loo, Maurice Quentin de la Tour, Peter Paul Rubens, Jan Steen, Jan van Os, and Arthur Devis. In Clayton, in the mansion Frick lived in are 19th Century paintings by Jules Cazin, Jean-François Raffaëlli, and Anton Mauve.

Automobiles on display include an 1881 Brougham, 1898 Panhard et Levassor Tonneau, 1903 Baker Electric, 1906 Outing Wagon, 1909 Bailey Electric Phaeton, 1909 Keystone Sixty-Six Roadster, 1911 Penn 30 Touring Car, 1912 Daimler Landaulet, 1914 Ford Model T Touring Car, 1914 Rolls-Royce Silver Ghost Touring Car, 1917 Standard  Model E Touring Car, 1924 Auto Red Bug Flyer, 1931 Lincoln Model K Sport Phaeton, and 1940 American Bantam Convertible Coupe.

The museum will be hosting the visiting exhibition, Killer Heels starting in June 2016.

Selection of works located at the Art and Historical Center

See also

 Frick Collection
 Frick Fine Arts Building
 Frick Park
 Culture of Pittsburgh

References

Bibliography

External links

 
 The Frick Pittsburgh at Google Cultural Institute
 360° panorama of the Clayton's parlor
 360° panorama of the Clayton's library and sitting room

Art museums and galleries in Pennsylvania
Automobile museums in Pennsylvania
Biographical museums in Pennsylvania
Historic house museums in Pennsylvania
Houses in Pittsburgh
Museums in Pittsburgh
Pittsburgh History & Landmarks Foundation Historic Landmarks
Tourist attractions in Pittsburgh